The heats for the men's 50 metre freestyle race at the 2009 World Championships took place on 31 July (heats and semifinals) and 1 August 2009 (final) at the Foro Italico in Rome, Italy.

Records
Prior to this competition, the existing world and competition records were as follows:

The following records were established during the competition:

Results

Heats

Semifinals

Swim-off

Final

External links 

Freestyle Men 50